A hunter is a person who hunts.

Hunter may also refer to:

People

Name
 Hunter (given name)
 Hunter (surname)
 Clan Hunter, a Scottish clan

Stage name or nickname
 Hunter (rapper), (1975-2011) an Australian rapper and hip hop artist
 Klaas-Jan Huntelaar, a Dutch footballer nicknamed "The Hunter"

Places

Australia
 Division of Hunter, an electoral district in the Australian House of Representatives, New South Wales
 Hunter Island (Tasmania), Australia
 Hunter Line, a NSW TrainLink passenger train service, New South Wales
 Hunter Region, New South Wales
 Hunter River (New South Wales)
 Hunter Valley (disambiguation), New South Wales

North America

Canada
 Hunter Island (British Columbia)
 Hunter Island (Ontario)

United States
 Hunter, Arkansas
 Hunter Township, Edgar County, Illinois 
 Fontanet, Indiana or Hunter
 Hunter, Kansas
 Hunter Township, Jackson County, Minnesota
 Hunter, Missouri
 Hunter, Nevada
 Hunter, New York
 Hunter (village), New York
 Hunter Island (Bronx), a peninsula and former island
 Hunter, North Dakota
 Hunter, Belmont County, Ohio
 Hunter, Ohio (in Warren County)
 Hunter, Oklahoma
 Hunter, Tennessee
 Hunter, Wisconsin

Elsewhere
 Hunter, Grand Bahama
 Hunter Island (South Pacific), part of the Matthew and Hunter Islands
 Orion (constellation) or The Hunter

Arts, entertainment, and media

Fictional characters
 Hunter (Gargoyles), a character in the television series Gargoyles
 Hunter (World of Warcraft), a character class in World of Warcraft
 A monster type in the video game Prototype
 A character in the television series Road Rovers
 A corrupted prince in the video game Prince of Persia
 Hunter Clarington, a character in the television series Glee
 Hunter Owen (EastEnders), a character in the British soap opera EastEnders
 Hunter, a clone trooper in Star Wars: The Bad Batch

Films
 Hunter (1973 film), a 1973 film
 The Hunter (1980 film), a 1980 film
 Hunter, the working title of the 1987 film Predator
 Shikari: The Hunter, a 1991 Hindi film
 The Hunter (2011 Australian film), a 2011 Australian movie

Games
 Hunter (video game), a 3D graphic adventure by Activision
 Hunter: The Reckoning, a role-playing game
 Hunter: The Reckoning (video game), a video game based on the game
 theHunter, an online first-person hunting game series

Literature
 Hunter (Huggins novel), a 1999 novel by James Byron Huggins
 Hunter (Pierce novel), a 1989 novel by William Luther Pierce

Music

Groups
 Hunter (band), a Polish metal band
 Cunter (band), a Canadian hardcore punk supergroup formerly known as Hunter

Albums
 Hunter (A Life Once Lost album)
 Hunter (Anna Calvi album)

Songs
 "Hunter" (Björk song)
 "Hunter" (Dido song)
 "Hunter" (Galantis song)
 "Hunter", by Gotthard from their self-titled debut album

Television

Series
Hunter (1967 TV series), a 1967–1969 Australian espionage series
Hunter (1977 TV series), a 1977 American espionage television series
Hunter (1984 American TV series), a 1984–1991 American police detective series
Hunter (1984 Australian TV series), a 1984–1985 Australian children's programme
Hunter (British TV serial), a 2009 BBC One sequel drama to Five Days

Businesses
 A. Hunter & Son, a London pipe organ builder (1856-1937)
 Hunter Boot Ltd, a Scottish manufacturer of Wellington boots
 Hunter Industries, a large private corporation in the manufacturing industry
 Hunter Marine, a sailboat manufacturing company

Education
 Hunter College, a college of the City University of New York
 Hunter College High School, a high school in New York City

Horses
 Field hunter, type of horse used in the hunt field for fox hunting
 Show hunter a horse that competes in the American hunter division, a branch of competitive horse show jumping competition

Military

Military ships
HMS Hunter (1812), a 10-gun brig
HMS Hunter (1895), a Handy-class destroyer
HMS Hunter (1945), a tank landing ship
HMS Hunter (D80), a Bogue-class escort carrier
HMS Hunter (H35), an H-class destroyer launched in 1936

Other military uses
 Hawker Hunter, a British subsonic jet fighter from the 1950s and 60s
 Hunter Army Airfield, a U.S. Army airfield near Savannah, Georgia
 RQ-5 Hunter, an unmanned aerial vehicle
 Hunter AFV, a Singaporean tracked armoured fighting vehicle

Transportation
 Hillman Hunter, a car produced in the 1960s and 1970s
 New South Wales Hunter railcar, also called Hunter, a railcar operated by NSW TrainLink in New South Wales, Australia
 UAZ Hunter, a Russian jeep made by UAZ

Other uses
 Hunter (watch), a type of pocket watch
 Hunter syndrome, a hereditary disease
 Hunter's bend, a bend knot
 Hunter-gatherer, a human living in a society in which most or all food is obtained by foraging (collecting wild plants and pursuing wild animals)
 Porvoo Hunters, an ice hockey team from Finland
 Hunters, the main antagonists of YouTube series Minecraft Manhunt by Dream (YouTuber)

See also

 Hunterrr, a 2015 Hindi film

 Hunter Island (disambiguation)
 Justice Hunter (disambiguation)
 The Hunter (disambiguation)
 The Hunters (disambiguation)
 Hunters (disambiguation)
 
 
 Hunt (disambiguation)
 Hunting (disambiguation)
 Huntress (disambiguation)
 Huntsman (disambiguation)

 Cacciatore (disambiguation)
 Cazador (disambiguation)
 Chasseur (disambiguation)